After School is a Hong Kong children's television programme produced by TVB. The programme aired on weekdays from 3 January 2005 to 9 January 2015, and was succeeded by Kids, Think Big.

The programme teaches a variety of activities, including Sports, Arts and often advises children to have a healthy diet and lifestyle. The programme's main mascot has an Onion-shaped head, who supposedly crashlanded onto Earth.

External links
After School ICU Homepage (TVB, Chinese)

TVB original programming
2000s Hong Kong television series
2010s Hong Kong television series
2005 Hong Kong television series debuts
2015 Hong Kong television series endings
Hong Kong children's television series